Word on tha Streets is the third studio album from Kansas City, Missouri based hip hop duo Skatterman & Snug Brim. Their second and final album to be released on under Strange Music, the album was released on August 12, 2008

On July 22, a music video for the song "Ups And Downs" was released on the internet via video site YouTube.

Track listing

References 

2008 albums
Albums produced by Seven (record producer)
Hip hop albums by American artists
Strange Music albums